Pygmy tyrants are found in the following genera:
 Euscarthmus
 Myiornis
 Lophotriccus
 Atalotriccus

Birds by common name